Egypt is an unincorporated community located in northern Holmes County, Mississippi.

References

Unincorporated communities in Holmes County, Mississippi
Unincorporated communities in Mississippi